Penicillium terrenum is an anamorph species of fungus in the genus Penicillium.

References

Further reading 
 

terrenum
Fungi described in 1968